The flag of Agin-Buryat Okrug, in the Russian Federation, is a vertical tricolour of blue, yellow and white.  The flag is charged with a yellow partial Soyombo symbol at the upper end of the blue band.  The Soyombo is a cultural symbol of the Mongol people and is also present on the flags of Mongolia and Buryatia.

The flag was designed by Buryat artist, Bato Dampilon.  It was adopted on July 6, 2001.  The proportions are 2:3.

References

Flags of the World

Flag
Flags of the federal subjects of Russia
Agin
Flags introduced in 2001